The 2022 European Rugby Champions Cup Final was the final match of the 2021–22 European Rugby Champions Cup, and the twenty-seventh European club rugby final in general. The final was contested between La Rochelle and Leinster with La Rochelle winning the game with a late try.

Despite having hosted a number of Champions Cup semi-finals, the Stade Vélodrome hosted its first European final, two years later than expected after it was rearranged from 2020 due to the COVID-19 pandemic.

Background
Both Leinster and La Rochelle entered the final on similar form, with both teams having won 7 out of their 8 games in the Championship, with both losses being a default result due to cancellations earlier in the campaign.

This was Leinster's sixth appearance in the Champions Cup Final, winning four and losing one, their last win being in 2018. If Leinster had won, it would have been a record equalling victory for them, joining Toulouse with five European titles to their name. For La Rochelle, this was the second time they have made the final, after they made the final in the previous year. They became the first team since Leinster to appear in back-to-back finals after the Irish side achieved this in 2018 and 2019. La Rochelle's victory was the first major trophy for the club.

The two sides had met just once before in the Champions Cup, with La Rochelle triumphing 32–23 in last season’s semi-finals and it was the fifth time that an Irish team faced a TOP 14 club in the European Cup final, with Irish sides having won on each of the previous four occasions.

Route to the final

Note: In all results below, the score of the finalist is given first (H: home; A: away).

Match

Details

References

Final
2020
May 2022 sports events in France